Wolverton is a city in Wilkin County, Minnesota, United States.  The population was 128 at the 2020 census. It is part of the Wahpeton, ND—MN Micropolitan Statistical Area.

Geography
Wolverton contains one property listed on the National Register of Historic Places, the 1906 Wolverton Public School.

Demographics

2010 census
As of the census of 2010, there were 142 people, 58 households, and 39 families living in the city. The racial makeup of the city was 95.8% White and 4.2% from two or more races.

There were 58 households, of which 27.6% had children under the age of 18 living with them, 60.3% were married couples living together, 3.4% had a female householder with no husband present, 3.4% had a male householder with no wife present, and 32.8% were non-families. 31.0% of all households were made up of individuals, and 12% had someone living alone who was 65 years of age or older. The average household size was 2.45 and the average family size was 3.05.

The median age in the city was 34 years. 28.9% of residents were under the age of 18; 3.5% were between the ages of 18 and 24; 30.9% were from 25 to 44; 21.7% were from 45 to 64; and 14.8% were 65 years of age or older. The gender makeup of the city was 52.1% male and 47.9% female.

2000 census
As of the census of 2000, there were 122 people, 55 households, and 32 families living in the city. The racial makeup of the city was 96.72% White, 2.46% from other races, and 0.82% from two or more races. Hispanic or Latino of any race were 2.46% of the population.

There were 55 households, out of which 23.6% had children under the age of 18 living with them, 45.5% were married couples living together, 1.8% had a female householder with no husband present, and 41.8% were non-families. 36.4% of all households were made up of individuals, and 23.6% had someone living alone who was 65 years of age or older. The average household size was 2.22 and the average family size was 2.91.

In the city, the population was spread out, with 23.0% under the age of 18, 12.3% from 18 to 24, 27.0% from 25 to 44, 17.2% from 45 to 64, and 20.5% who were 65 years of age or older. The median age was 37 years. For every 100 females, there were 82.1 males. For every 100 females age 18 and over, there were 95.8 males.

The median income for a household in the city was $29,063, and the median income for a family was $35,000. Males had a median income of $25,000 versus $28,000 for females. The per capita income for the city was $16,839. There were 11.1% of families and 15.7% of the population living below the poverty line, including 32.3% of under eighteens and 6.7% of those over 64.

References

Cities in Wilkin County, Minnesota
Cities in Minnesota
Wahpeton micropolitan area